The Devil by the Tail (French: Le diable par la queue) is a 1969 French-Italian comedy film directed by Philippe de Broca and starring Yves Montand, Madeleine Renaud and Maria Schell.

Cast
 Yves Montand as Le baron César Maricorne 
 Madeleine Renaud as La marquise 
 Maria Schell as La comtesse Diane 
 Jean Rochefort as Le comte Georges 
 Jean-Pierre Marielle as Jean-Jacques Leroy-Martin, le "play-boy" 
 Clotilde Joano as La comtesse Jeanne 
 Claude Piéplu as Monsieur Patin 
 Tanya Lopert as Cookie 
 Marthe Keller as Amélie 
 Xavier Gélin as Charlie 
 Jacques Balutin as Max, un gangster 
 Pierre Tornade as Schwartz, un gangster 
 Jeanne Berdin as Mme Passereau 
 Charles Mallet as Le commissaire

References

Bibliography 
 Monaco, James. The Encyclopedia of Film. Perigee Books, 1991.

External links 
 

1969 films
1960s historical comedy films
French historical comedy films
1960s French-language films
Italian historical comedy films
Films directed by Philippe de Broca
United Artists films
1969 comedy films
1960s French films
1960s Italian films